Lithuania District was an administrative division of German-controlled territory of Ober-Ost during World War I. It was bordered by the Bialystok-Grodno District to the south and the Courland District to the north.

History
The area was formed roughly from parts of the former Vilna Governorate and Suvalki Governorate of the Russian Empire.

References

German Empire in World War I
History of Vilnius